The Definitive Collection is a compilation album released from country music singer-songwriter, Billy Ray Cyrus in June 2004. The album is part of Universal Music Group's The Definitive Collection series and was released without Cyrus' supervision, thus no new material was recorded. "Fastest Horse in a One-Horse Town" was not previously included on any of Cyrus's albums, although he recorded it for a compilation called NASCAR: Runnin' Wide Open.

Track listing

References

2004 compilation albums
Billy Ray Cyrus albums
Mercury Records compilation albums